This article is about the first election held in Independent India in 1955

Presidential election

The Election Commission of India held the first presidential elections of India on May 2, 1952. Dr. Rajendra Prasad won his first election with 670000 votes over his nearest rival K.T. Shah who got 92,827 votes.

General election

General elections to the first Lok Sabha since independence were held in India between 25 October 1951 and 21 February 1952. The Indian National Congress (INC) stormed into power, winning 364 of the 489 seats. Pandit Jawaharlal Nehru became the first democratically elected Prime Minister of the country.
 Total Seats : 489

 Communist Party of India : 16
 Socialist Party : 12
 Kisan Mazdoor Praja Party : 9
 Bharatiya Jana Sangh : 3

Legislative Assembly elections

Ajmer*

* : On 1 November 1956, Ajmer State was merged into Rajasthan under States Reorganisation Act, 1956.

Assam

Bhopal*

* : On 1 November 1956, Bhopal State was merged into Madhya Pradesh under States Reorganisation Act, 1956.
Bhopal states 1955

Bihar*

* : Bihar was reduced slightly by the transfer of minor territories to West Bengal in 1956 under States Reorganisation Act, 1956.

Bombay*

*: On 1 November 1956, under States Reorganisation Act, 1956, Bombay state was re-organized by the addition of Saurashtra State and Kutch State, Nagpur Division of Madhya Pradesh, and Marathwada region of Hyderabad. The state's southernmost districts of Bombay were transferred to Mysore State while Abu Road taluka of the Banaskantha district was transferred to Rajasthan.

Coorg*

* : On 1 November 1956, Coorg State was merged into Mysore State as per the States Reorganisation Act, 1956.

Delhi*

* : On 1 November 1956, under States Reorganisation Act, 1956, Delhi was made a Union Territory under the direct administration of the President of India and the Delhi Legislative Assembly was abolished simultaneously. Next legislative assembly elections in Delhi were held in 1993, when Union Territory of Delhi was formally declared as National Capital Territory of Delhi by the Sixty-ninth Amendment to the Indian constitution.

Himachal Pradesh*

* : Under States Reorganisation Act, 1956, Himachal Pradesh became a Union Territory on 1 November 1956, under the direct administration of the President of India and the Himachal Pradesh Legislative Assembly was abolished simultaneously. Under Punjab Reorganisation Act, 1966, it became a state and the next legislative elections were held in 1967.

Hyderabad*

* : On 1 November 1956, Hyderabad State, except the districts of Raichur, Gulbarga, Bidar and Marathwada, was merged into Andhra State to form a single state, Andhra Pradesh, under States Reorganisation Act, 1956. The districts of Raichur, Bidar and Gulbarga were transferred to the Mysore State, while the Marathwada district was merged with the Bombay State.

Madhya Bharat*

* : On 1 November 1956, under States Reorganisation Act, 1956, Madhya Bharat (except the Sunel enclave of the Mandsaur district) was merged into Madhya Pradesh and the Sunel enclave of the Mandsaur district of Madhya Bharat was merged in Rajasthan.

Madhya Pradesh*

* : On 1 November 1956, under States Reorganisation Act, 1956, Madhya Bharat (except the Sunel enclave of the Mandsaur district), Vindhya Pradesh, Bhopal State and the Sironj sub-division of the Kota district of Rajasthan were merged into Madhya Pradesh while the Nagpur Division was transferred to Bombay State.

Madras*

* : On 1 November 1956, the southern part of Travancore-Cochin (Kanyakumari district) was added to the Madras State while the Malabar district of the state was transferred to the new state of Kerala, and a new union territory, Laccadive, Minicoy and Amindivi Islands, was created.

Mysore*

* : On 1 November 1956, Mysore state was enlarged by the addition of Coorg State, the Kollegal taluk of the Coimbatore district and the South Kanara district (except the Kasaragod taluk) of Madras State,  and the Kannada speaking districts from southern Bombay state and western Hyderabad State under States Reorganisation Act, 1956. The Siruguppa taluk, the Bellary taluk, the Hospet taluk and a small area of the Mallapuram sub-taluk were detached from the Mysore State.

Orissa

Patiala & East Punjab States Union

Punjab*

* : Punjab was enlarged by the addition of Patiala & East Punjab States Union in 1956 under States Reorganisation Act of 1956.

Rajasthan*

Saurashtra*

* : On 1 November 1956, Saurashtra State was merged into Bombay State as per the States Reorganisation Act, 1956.

Travancore-Cochin

$ : In 1952 elections of legislative assembly, no party found the majority. Indian National Congress formed a coalition government with the help of Travancore Tamil Nadu Congress, Kerala Socialist Party and a nominated member.

Uttar Pradesh

Vindhya Pradesh*

* : On 1 November 1956, Vindhya Pradesh was merged into Madhya Pradesh under States Reorganisation Act, 1956.

West Bengal*

* : West Bengal was enlarged slightly by the transfer of minor territories from Bihar in 1956 under States Reorganisation Act, 1956.

See also
 1954 elections in India
 1955 elections in India
 1957 elections in India

References

External links

Election Commission of India

1951 elections in India
1952 elections in India
India
India
1951 in India
1952 in India
Elections in India by year